WLFM (103.9 FM, "K-LOVE") is a broadcast radio station licensed to Lawrenceburg, Tennessee, serving Lawrenceburg and Lawrence County, Tennessee. WLFM is owned and operated by Educational Media Foundation, and broadcasts EMF's contemporary Christian K-LOVE format.

Previous logos

External links

Radio stations established in 1965
1965 establishments in Tennessee
Contemporary Christian radio stations in the United States
Educational Media Foundation radio stations
K-Love radio stations
LFM (FM)